Troia may refer to:

 Troia (surname), a surname

Places and jurisdictions

Europe 
 Troia, Apulia, a comune in the Province of Foggia, southern Italy
 the former Roman Catholic Diocese of Troia, since 1986 included in the Roman Catholic Diocese of Lucera–Troia, with see in the above town
 Troia Cathedral
 Uva di Troia, a grape variety
 Tróia Peninsula, a peninsula in Setúbal District, Alentejo, Portugal

Near East 
 Troy (Ilion, Illium), an archaeological site in Çanakkale Province, Marmara, Asian Turkey
 Tura, Egypt, a town in Cairo Governorate, Egypt

Fiction and entertainment 
 Troia (board game), a German board game
 Troia, a town in the video game Final Fantasy IV
 Troia Base, a level in the video game Mega Man X8
 Donna Troy, a character from the American comic company DC Comics who was formerly Wonder Girl

See also 
 Troja (disambiguation)
 Troy (disambiguation)
 Troya (disambiguation)